Partridge Creek is a stream in Marquette County, Michigan, in the United States.

Partridge Creek was named for the ruffed grouse, commonly called a partridge, seen at the creek by early surveyors.

See also
List of rivers of Michigan

References

Rivers of Marquette County, Michigan
Rivers of Michigan